Shizar (also Romanized as Shīzar; also known as Shazar and Shizar Afshariyeh) is a village in Dodangeh-ye Sofla Rural District, Ziaabad District, Takestan County, Qazvin Province, Iran. At the 2006 census, its population was 219, in 70 families.

References 

Populated places in Takestan County